

Hemidactylus is a genus of the common gecko family, Gekkonidae. It has 191 described species, newfound ones being described every few years. These geckos are found in all the tropical regions of the world, extending into the subtropical parts of Africa and Europe. They excel in colonizing oceanic islands by rafting on flotsam, and are for example found across most of Polynesia. In some archipelagoes, cryptic species complexes are found.  Geckos like to live in and out of houses.  They have been introduced to Australia.

The species are typically known as house geckos, due to their readiness to adapt to and coexist with humans, and can be easily encountered in human habitations. This genus was originally established by Lorenz Oken in 1817 for the species at that time known as Hemidactylus tuberculosus, and now described as the tropical house gecko (Hemidactylus mabouia).

This species is closely related to the genus Gehyra, which belongs to the same family in Gekkonidae.

Evolution
The origin of the genus Hemidactylus is still unclear as the higher level phylogeny is not well resolved. Moreover, much of the diversity in this group still remains to be discovered.

Feces
A house gecko will usually confine its excretions to one area of a house. This is sometimes considered a nuisance by home owners, and may stain certain surfaces. The feces are approximately five (5) millimeters in length, two (2) millimeters wide, and dark brown (almost black) in color.

Description

The dorsal lepidosis is either uniform or heterogeneous. The pupil of the eye is vertical. Males have pre-anal or femoral pores. Each finger or toe has a slender distal clawed joint, angularly bent and rising from within the extremity of the dilated portion.

The fingers and toes are free, or more or less webbed, and dilated; underneath they bear two rows of lamellae in a pattern resembling a paripinnate compound leaf. This leads to their other and more ambiguous common name, "leaf-toed geckos", used mainly for species from South Asia and its surroundings to prevent confusion with the many "leaf-toed" Gekkota not in Hemidactylus.

Some members of the genus, such as H. platyurus, are able to run quadrupedally across water by a partially surface tension-dependent mechanism distinct from the bipedal gait of basilisks.

Communication
Like many other gecko species, species in the genus Hemidactylus are able to communicate with distinct vocalizations. Depending on the species, their vocalizations range from quiet clicks to short squeaks and chirps. For example, the Asian common house gecko (Hemidactylus frenatus) is notable for its distinctive chirping.

Species

Hemidactylus aaronbaueri Giri, 2008 – Aaron Bauer's house gecko
Hemidactylus acanthopholis Mirza & Sanap, 2014
Hemidactylus achaemenidicus 
Hemidactylus adensis Šmíd et al., 2014
Hemidactylus aemulus Kumar, Srinivasulu, & Srinivasulu, 2022
Hemidactylus afarensis  – Afar gecko
Hemidactylus agrius Vanzolini, 1978 – country leaf-toed gecko
Hemidactylus albituberculatus Trape, 2012
Hemidactylus albivertebralis  Trape & Böhme, 2012
Hemidactylus albofasciatus Grandison & Soman, 1963 – white-striped viper gecko
Hemidactylus albopunctatus Loveridge, 1947 – white-spotted gecko, white-spotted leaf-toed gecko
Hemidactylus alfarraji Šmid, Shobrak, Wilms, Joger & Carranza, 2016
Hemidactylus alkiyumii Carranza & Arnold, 2012
Hemidactylus almakhwah Šmíd, Uvizl, Shobrak, Busais,Salim, Algethami,  Algethami, Alanazi, Alsubaie, Rovatsos, Nováková, Mazuch, &  Carranza, 2022
Hemidactylus angulatus Hallowell, 1854
Hemidactylus ansorgii Boulenger, 1901 – Nigerian leaf-toed gecko
Hemidactylus aporus Boulenger, 1906 – Annobon leaf-toed gecko
Hemidactylus aquilonius McMahan & Zug, 2007
Hemidactylus arnoldi Lanza, 1978 – Arnold's leaf-toed gecko
Hemidactylus asirensis Šmid, Shobrak, Wilms, Joger, & Carranza, 2016
Hemidactylus awashensis Šmíd et al., 2014
Hemidactylus barbierii Sindaco, Razzetti & Ziliani, 2007
Hemidactylus barbouri Loveridge, 1942 – Barbour’s leaf-toed gecko
Hemidactylus barodanus Boulenger, 1901 – enigmatic gecko
Hemidactylus bavazzanoi Lanza, 1978 – Somali banded gecko, Bavazzano’s gecko
Hemidactylus bayonii Bocage, 1893 – Barboza's leaf-toed gecko
Hemidactylus benguellensis Bocage, 1893 – Benguela house gecko
Hemidactylus beninensis Bauer, Tchibozo, Pauwels & Lenglet, 2006
Hemidactylus biokoensis Wagner, Leaché & Fujita, 2014 – Bioko leaf-toed gecko
Hemidactylus boavistensis Boulenger, 1906 – Boa Vista leaf-toed gecko
Hemidactylus bouvieri (Bocourt, 1870) – Bouvier's leaf-toed gecko, Cape Verde leaf-toed gecko
Hemidactylus bowringii (Gray, 1845) – Oriental leaf-toed gecko, Bowring's gecko, Sikkimese dark-spotted gecko, Asian smooth gecko  
Hemidactylus brasilianus Amaral, 1935 – Amaral's Brazilian gecko
Hemidactylus brookii Gray, 1845 – Brooke's house gecko, spotted house gecko
Hemidactylus carivoensis Lobón-Rovira, Conradie, Iglesias, Ernst, Veríssimo, Baptista, & Pinto, 2021
Hemidactylus chikhaldaraensis Agarwal, Bauer, Giri & Khandekar, 2019 – Chikhaldara brookiish gecko
Hemidactylus chipkali Mirza & Raju, 2017 – Central Indian leaf-toed gecko
Hemidactylus cinganji Lobón-Rovira, Conradie, Iglesias, Ernst, Veríssimo, Baptista, & Pinto, 2021
Hemidactylus citernii Boulenger, 1912 – speedy leaf-toed gecko
Hemidactylus coalescens Wagner, Leaché & Fujita, 2014
Hemidactylus craspedotus Mocquard, 1890 – Mocquard's house gecko, frilled gecko, frilled house gecko
Hemidactylus curlei Parker, 1942 – Parker's gecko, northern leaf-toed gecko
Hemidactylus dawudazraqi Moravec, Kratochvíl, Amr, Jandzik, Šmíd & Gvoždík, 2011
Hemidactylus depressus Gray, 1842 – Sri Lankan leaf-nosed gecko, Kandyan gecko
Hemidactylus dracaenacolus Rösler & Wranik, 1999
Hemidactylus easai Das, Pal, Siddharth, Palot, Deepak, & Narayanan, 2022
Hemidactylus echinus O'Shaughnessy, 1875 – hedgehog leaf-toed gecko
Hemidactylus endophis Carranza & Arnold, 2012
Hemidactylus eniangii Wagner, Leaché & Fujita, 2014
Hemidactylus farasani Šmíd, Uvizl, Shobrak, Busais,Salim, Algethami,  Algethami, Alanazi, Alsubaie, Rovatsos, Nováková, Mazuch, &  Carranza, 2022 – Farasan gecko
Hemidactylus fasciatus Gray, 1842 – banded leaf-toed gecko
Hemidactylus faustus Lobón-Rovira, Conradie, Iglesias, Ernst, Veríssimo, Baptista, & Pinto, 2021
Hemidactylus festivus Carranza & Arnold, 2012
Hemidactylus flavicauda Lajmi, Giri, Singh, & Agarwal, 2020 – Mahabubnagar yellow-tailed brookiish gecko 
Hemidactylus flaviviridis Rüppell, 1835 – yellow-bellied gecko, northern house gecko
Hemidactylus forbesii Boulenger, 1899 – Socotra leaf-toed gecko
Hemidactylus foudaii Baha El Din, 2003
Hemidactylus fragilis Calabresi, 1915
Hemidactylus frenatus Schlegel, 1836 – common house gecko, Asian house gecko, Pacific house gecko
Hemidactylus funaiolii Lanza, 1978 – Archer's post gecko, Kenya leaf-toed gecko
Hemidactylus garnotii A.M.C. Duméril & Bibron, 1836 – Indo-Pacific gecko, Garnot's house gecko, fox gecko, Assam greyish-brown gecko
Hemidactylus giganteus Stoliczka, 1871 – giant leaf-toed gecko, giant southern tree gecko, giant gecko
Hemidactylus gleadowi Murray, 1884 – Gleadow's house gecko
Hemidactylus gracilis Blanford, 1870 – graceful leaf-toed gecko
Hemidactylus gramineus Ceríaco, Bauer, Kusamba, Agarwal, & Greenbaum, 2021
Hemidactylus granchii Lanza, 1978 – Granchi's leaf-toed gecko
Hemidactylus graniticolus Agarwal, Giri & Bauer, 2011
Hemidactylus granosus Heyden, 1827
Hemidactylus granti Boulenger, 1899 – Grant's leaf-toed gecko
Hemidactylus greeffii Bocage, 1886 – Greeff's gecko, Greeff's giant gecko
Hemidactylus gujaratensis Giri, Bauer, Vyas & S. Patil, 2009 – Gujarat gecko
Hemidactylus hajarensis Carranza & Arnold, 2012
Hemidactylus hegdei Pal & Mirza, 2022
Hemidactylus hemchandrai Dandge & Tiple, 2015
Hemidactylus homoeolepis Blanford, 1881 – Arabian leaf-toed gecko
Hemidactylus hunae Deraniyagala, 1937 – spotted giant gecko
Hemidactylus imbricatus Bauer et al., 2008 – carrot-tailed viper gecko
Hemidactylus inexpectatus Carranza & Arnold, 2012
Hemidactylus inintellectus Sindaco, Ziliani, Razzetti, Pupin, Grieco, 2009 – Socotran rock gecko
Hemidactylus isolepis Boulenger, 1895 – scaly leaf-toed gecko, uniform-scaled gecko
Hemidactylus ituriensis Schmidt, 1919 – Ituri leaf-toed gecko
Hemidactylus jubensis Boulenger, 1895 – Ethiopian gecko, Mrioen leaf-toed gecko
Hemidactylus jumailiae Busais & Joger, 2011
Hemidactylus kamdemtohami Bauer & Pauwels, 2002 – Kamdem Toham's gecko
Hemidactylus kangerensis Mirza, Bhosale & R. Patil, 2017
Hemidactylus karenorum (Theobald, 1868) – Burmese spotted gecko, Burmese leaf-toed gecko
Hemidactylus kimbulae Amarasinghe, Karunarathna, Campbell, Madawala, & de Silva, 2021
Hemidactylus klauberi Scortecci, 1948
Hemidactylus kolliensis Agarwal, Bauer, Giri & Khandekar, 2019 – Kolli rock gecko
Hemidactylus kundaensis Chirio & Trape, 2012
Hemidactylus kushmorensis Murray, 1884 – Kushmore house gecko
Hemidactylus kyaboboensis Wagner, Leaché & Fujita, 2014
Hemidactylus laevis Boulenger, 1901 – common leaf-toed gecko
Hemidactylus lamaensis Ullenbruch, Grell & Bohme, 2010
Hemidactylus lankae Deraniyagala, 1953 – termite hill gecko, Sri Lankan leaf-toed gecko
Hemidactylus lanzai 
Hemidactylus laticaudatus L.G. Andersson, 1910 – Andersson's leaf-toed gecko
Hemidactylus lavadeserticus Moravec & Bohme, 1997 – Syrian house gecko
Hemidactylus lemurinus Arnold, 1980 Dhofar leaf-toed gecko, Oman ghost leaf-toed gecko
Hemidactylus leschenaultii A.M.C. Duméril & Bibron, 1836 – Leschenault's leaf-toed gecko
Hemidactylus longicephalus Bocage, 1873
Hemidactylus lopezjuradoi Arnold, Vasconcelos, Harris, Mateo & Carranza, 2008 (formerly in H. bouvieri)
Hemidactylus luqueorum Carranza & Arnold, 2012
Hemidactylus mabouia (Moreau de Jonnès, 1818) – tropical house gecko, Afro-American house gecko, cosmopolitan house gecko
Hemidactylus macropholis Boulenger, 1896 – Boulenger’s gecko, large-scaled leaf-toed gecko
Hemidactylus maculatus A.M.C. Duméril & Bibron, 1836 – spotted leaf-toed gecko, giant spotted gecko
Hemidactylus mahonyi Adhikari, Achyuthan, Kumar, Khot, Shreeram, & Ganesh, 2022
Hemidactylus makolowodei Bauer, Lebreton, Chirio, Ineich & Talla Kouete, 2006
Hemidactylus malcolmsmithi (Constable, 1949) – Malcolm's bow-fingered gecko, Smith's bent-toed gecko
Hemidactylus mandebensis Šmíd et al., 2014
Hemidactylus masirahensis Carranza & Arnold, 2012
Hemidactylus matschiei (Tornier, 1901) – Togo leaf-toed gecko
Hemidactylus megalops Parker, 1932 – Parker's leaf-toed gecko
Hemidactylus mercatorius Gray, 1842
Hemidactylus mindiae Baha El Din, 2005 – Mount Sinai gecko
Hemidactylus minutus Vasconcelos & Carranza, 2014
Hemidactylus modestus (Günther, 1894) – moderate leaf-toed gecko, Tana River gecko
Hemidactylus montanus Busais & Joger, 2011 – mountain leaf-toed gecko
Hemidactylus mrimaensis Malonzo & Bauer, 2014 – Kaya gecko
Hemidactylus muriceus W. Peters, 1870 – Guinea leaf-toed gecko
Hemidactylus murrayi Gleadow, 1887 – Murray's house gecko
Hemidactylus newtoni Ferreira, 1897 – Newton's leaf-toed gecko
Hemidactylus nicolauensis Vasconcelos, Kohler, Geniez, & Crochet, 2020
Hemidactylus nzingae  – Queen Nzinga’s tropical gecko
Hemidactylus ophiolepis Boulenger, 1903 – snake-scaled leaf-toed gecko
Hemidactylus ophiolepoides Lanza, 1978 – Lanza's leaf-toed gecko
Hemidactylus oxyrhinus Boulenger, 1899 – sharp-nosed leaf-toed gecko
Hemidactylus paaragowli Srikanthan, Swamy, Mohan & Pal, 2018 – Travancore rock gecko
Hemidactylus paivae  – Paiva’s gecko
Hemidactylus palaichthus Kluge, 1969 – Antilles leaf-toed gecko
Hemidactylus parvimaculatus Deraniyagala, 1953 – spotted house gecko
Hemidactylus pauciporosus Lanza, 1978
Hemidactylus paucituberculatus Carranza & Arnold, 2012
Hemidactylus persicus J. Anderson, 1872 – Persian leaf-toed gecko, Persian gecko
Hemidactylus pfindaensis Lobón-Rovira, Conradie, Iglesias, Ernst, Veríssimo, Baptista, & Pinto, 2021
Hemidactylus pieresii Kelaart, 1852
Hemidactylus platycephalus W. Peters, 1854 – tree gecko, flat-headed leaf-toed gecko, baobab gecko
Hemidactylus platyurus (Schneider, 1792) – flat-tailed house gecko, frilled house gecko, Asian house gecko
Hemidactylus porbandarensis Sharma, 1981
Hemidactylus prashadi M.A. Smith, 1935 – Bombay leaf-toed gecko, Prashad's gecko
Hemidactylus principensis Miller, Sellas & Drewes, 2012
Hemidactylus pseudomuriceus Henle & Böhme, 2003
Hemidactylus pseudoromeshkanicus 
Hemidactylus puccionii Calabresi, 1927 – Zanzibar leaf-toed gecko, Somali plain gecko
Hemidactylus pumilio Boulenger, 1899 – pygmy leaf-toed gecko
Hemidactylus raya Kumar, Srinivasulu, & Srinivasulu, 2022
Hemidactylus reticulatus Beddome, 1870 – reticulated leaf-toed gecko
Hemidactylus richardsonii Gray, 1845 – Richardson's leaf-toed gecko
Hemidactylus rishivalleyensis  Agarwal, Thackeray, & Khandekar, 2020 – Rishi Valley rock gecko
Hemidactylus robustus Heyden, 1827 – Heyden's gecko
Hemidactylus romeshkanicus Torki, 2011
Hemidactylus ruspolii Boulenger, 1896 – farm leaf-toed gecko, Ruspoli's gecko, turnip-tailed black and yellow gecko
Hemidactylus saba Busais & Joger, 2011
Hemidactylus sahgali Mirza, Gowande, R. Patil, Ambekar & Patel, 2018 – Sahgal’s termite hill gecko
Hemidactylus sankariensis Agarwal, Bauer, Giri & Khandekar, 2019 – Sankari brookiish gecko
Hemidactylus sassanidianus 
Hemidactylus sataraensis Giri & Bauer, 2008 – Satara gecko
Hemidactylus saxicolus Kumar, Srinivasulu, & Srinivasulu, 2022
Hemidactylus scabriceps (Annandale, 1906) – scaly gecko
Hemidactylus shihraensis Busais & Joger, 2011
Hemidactylus sinaitus Boulenger, 1885 – Red Sea gecko, Sinai leaf-toed gecko
Hemidactylus sirumalaiensis Khandekar, Thackeray, Pawar, & Agarwal, 2020
Hemidactylus siva C. Srinivasulu, A. Srinivasulu & Kumar, 2018 – Hampi rock gecko
Hemidactylus smithi Boulenger, 1895 – Smith's leaf-toed gecko
Hemidactylus somalicus Parker, 1932 – Northern Somali leaf-toed gecko
Hemidactylus squamulatus Tornier, 1896 – Tornier's leaf-toed gecko, Nyika gecko
Hemidactylus srikanthani Adhikari, Achyuthan, Kumar, Khot, Shreeram, & Ganesh, 2022
Hemidactylus stejnegeri Ota & Hikida, 1989 – Stejneger's leaf-toed gecko
Hemidactylus subtriedrus Jerdon, 1854 – Jerdon's gecko, Madras blotched gecko
Hemidactylus sushilduttai Giri, Bauer, Mohapatra, C. Srinivasulu & Agarwal, 2017 - Dutta Mahendragiri gecko
Hemidactylus tamhiniensis Khandekar, Thackeray, & Agarwal, 2021 - Tamhini giant rock gecko, basalt giant rock gecko 
Hemidactylus tanganicus Loveridge, 1929 - Tanzanian leaf-toed gecko, Tanzanian diamond gecko, Dutumi gecko
Hemidactylus tasmani Hewitt, 1932 - Tasmanian leaf-toed gecko
Hemidactylus taylori Parker, 1932
Hemidactylus tenkatei Lidth de Jeude, 1895
Hemidactylus thayene McMahan & Zug, 2007
Hemidactylus treutleri Mahony, 2009 - Treutler's gecko
Hemidactylus triedrus (Daudin, 1802) – termite hill gecko, Dakota's leaf-toed gecko, blotched house gecko
Hemidactylus tropidolepis Mocquard, 1888 – Mocquard's leaf-toed gecko, Ogaden gecko
Hemidactylus turcicus Linnaeus, 1758 – Mediterranean house gecko, Turkish gecko
Hemidactylus ulii Šmíd, Moravec, Kratochvil, Gvozdik, Nasher, Busais, Wilms, Shobrak & Carranza, 2013
Hemidactylus vanam  Chaitanya, Lajmi & Giri, 2018  - Megamalai rock gecko
Hemidactylus varadgirii Chaitanya, Agarwal, Lajmi & Khandekar, 2019 – Giri’s brookiish gecko, Amboli brookiish gecko
Hemidactylus vernayi Ceriaco, Agarwal, Marques, & Bauer, 2020 – Vernay’s tropical gecko
Hemidactylus vietnamensis Darevsky, Kupriyanova & Roshchin, 1984 - Vietnam leaf-toed gecko, Vietnam house gecko
Hemidactylus vijayraghavani  Mirza, 2018 
Hemidactylus whitakeri Mirza, Gowande, R. Patil, Ambekar & Patel, 2018 – Whitaker’s termite hill gecko
Hemidactylus xericolus Lajmi, Giri, Singh, & Agarwal, 2020 – Nalgonda yellow-tailed brookiish gecko
Hemidactylus yajurvedi Murthy, Bauer, Lajmi, Agarwal & Giri, 2015 - Kanker rock gecko
Hemidactylus yerburyi J. Anderson, 1895 Yerbury’s gecko, Yerburi’s leaf-toed gecko

Phylogeny
The following phylogeny is from Pyron, et al. (2013), and includes 47 Hemidactylus species. Hemidactylus is a sister group of Cyrtodactylus.

Similar genera
 Gehyra
 Lepidodactylus
 Diplodactylidae

References

External links

 Gekkonids 

 
Lizard genera
Taxa named by Lorenz Oken

id:Cecak
bcl:tabili